In topology, the wedge sum is a "one-point union" of a family of topological spaces. Specifically, if X and Y are pointed spaces (i.e. topological spaces with distinguished basepoints  and ) the wedge sum of X and Y is the quotient space of the disjoint union of X and Y by the identification 
 

where  is the equivalence closure of the relation 
More generally, suppose  is a indexed family of pointed spaces with basepoints  The wedge sum of the family is given by:

where  is the equivalence closure of the relation  
In other words, the wedge sum is the joining of several spaces at a single point. This definition is sensitive to the choice of the basepoints  unless the spaces  are homogeneous.

The wedge sum is again a pointed space, and the binary operation is associative and commutative (up to homeomorphism).

Sometimes the wedge sum is called the wedge product, but this is not the same concept as the exterior product, which is also often called the wedge product.

Examples
The wedge sum of two circles is homeomorphic to a figure-eight space. The wedge sum of  circles is often called a bouquet of circles, while a wedge product of arbitrary spheres is often called a bouquet of spheres.

A common construction in homotopy is to identify all of the points along the equator of an -sphere . Doing so results in two copies of the sphere, joined at the point that was the equator:

Let  be the map  that is, of identifying the equator down to a single point.

Here,  are maps which take a distinguished point  to the point  Note that the above uses the wedge sum of two functions, which is possible precisely because they agree at  the point common to the wedge sum of the underlying spaces.

Categorical description
The wedge sum can be understood as the coproduct in the category of pointed spaces. Alternatively, the wedge sum can be seen as the pushout of the diagram  in the category of topological spaces (where  is any one-point space).

Properties

See also
 Smash product
 Hawaiian earring, a topological space resembling, but not the same as, a wedge sum of countably many circles

References

 Rotman, Joseph. An Introduction to Algebraic Topology, Springer, 2004, p. 153. 

Topology
Operations on structures
Homotopy theory